Houston is a surname of Scottish origin. In the mountains of Scotland's west coast and on the Hebrides islands, the ancestors of the Houston family were born. Clan Houston comes from the medieval Scottish given name Hugh. Houston is a patronymic surname, which belongs to the category of hereditary surnames. In general, patronyms were derived from either the first name of the father of the bearer, or from the names of famous religious and secular figures. By and large, surnames descending from one's father's name were the most common. The surname also came from the place called Houston, Renfrewshire
in the west central Lowlands of Scotland. In Old English, the name Houston, meant the settlement belonging to Hugh.

People with the surname Houston include

A
Alasdair Houston, English biologist
Alexander Houston (1865–1933), Scottish policy expert
Allan Houston (born 1971), American basketball player
Amanda Houston (born 1980), British weather presenter
Andrew Houston (disambiguation), multiple people
Andy Houston (born 1970), American stock car racer
Angus Houston (born 1947), Australian air marshal

B
Barry Houston (born 1970), American professional wrestler
Bill Houston (disambiguation), multiple people
Bob Houston (1877–1954), Scottish footballer
Bobbie Houston (born 1957), New Zealand-Australian pastor
Bobby Houston (disambiguation), multiple people
Brad Houston, American ice hockey coach
Brian Houston (born 1954), New Zealand-Australian pastor
Brian Houston (musician), Irish musical artist
Byron Houston (born 1969), American basketball player

C
Charde Houston (born 1986), American basketball player
Charles Houston (disambiguation), multiple people
Cherylee Houston (born 1975), British actress
Chris Houston (disambiguation), multiple people
Christine Houston (born 1935), American writer
Cisco Houston (1918–1961), American singer-songwriter
Cissy Houston (born 1933), American singer
Clair Aubrey Huston, American stamp designer
Clint Houston (1946–2000), American bassist
C. Stuart Houston (1927–2021), American-Canadian physician

D
Dale Houston (1940–2007), American singer
Dale Houston (tennis) (born 1961), Australian tennis player
David Houston (disambiguation), multiple people
Demerio Houston (born 1996), American football player
Dennis Houston (born 1999), American football player
Deryk Houston (born 1954), Canadian artist
Dianne Houston (born 1954), American film director
Dick Houston (1863–1921), Australian cricketer
Donald Houston (1923–1991), Welsh actor
Doug Houston (born 1943), Scottish footballer
Drew Houston (born 1983), American internet entrepreneur
Drusilla Dunjee Houston (1876–1941), American writer

E
Edwin J. Houston (1847–1914), American businessman
Elsie Houston (1902–1943), Brazilian singer

F
Fitz Houston (born 1953), American actor
Frances C. Houston (1867–1906), American painter
Frank K. Houston (1881–1973), American businessman

G
Garry Houston (born 1971), Welsh golfer
Gavin Houston (born 1977), American actor
George Houston (disambiguation), multiple people
Glyn Houston (1925–2019), Welsh actor
Gordon Houston (1916–1942), American baseball player
G. David Houston (1880–1940), American professor
Graham Houston (born 1960), British footballer
Guy S. Houston (born 1961), American politician

H
Harold Houston (born 1990), Bermudian sprinter
Harold Houston (labor lawyer) (1872–1947), American labor lawyer
Harry R. Houston (1878–1960), American politician
Heather Houston (born 1959), Canadian curler
Henry Houston (disambiguation), multiple people
Herbert Sherman Houston (1866–1955), American businessman

J
Jack Houston (1919–2008), Australian politician
James Houston (disambiguation), multiple people
Jameson Houston (born 1996), American football player
Jamie Houston (born 1982), English-German rugby union footballer
Jean Houston (born 1937), American author
Jeanne Wakatsuki Houston (born 1934), American writer
Jennifer Houston (born 1971), Australian politician
Jesse Houston (1910–??), American baseball player
Jessica Houston (born 1989), American figure skater
Jim Houston (1937–2018), American football player
Jimmy Houston, American fisherman
Joel Houston (born 1979), Australian musician
John Houston (disambiguation), multiple people
Johnny Houston (1889–??), Irish footballer
Jordan Houston (footballer) (born 2000), Scottish footballer
Jordan Houston III (born 1975), better known as Juicy J, American rapper and record producer
Joshua Houston (1822–1902), American slave
JP Houston, American singer-songwriter
Justin Houston (born 1989), American football player

K
Ken Houston (born 1944), American football player
Ken Houston (ice hockey) (1953–2018), Canadian ice hockey player
Kenneth Houston (born 1941), Irish rugby union footballer
Kevin Houston (disambiguation), multiple people

L
Lamarr Houston (born 1987), American football player
Leroy Houston (born 1986), Australian rugby union footballer
Lin Houston (1921–1995), American football player
Livingston W. Houston (1891–1977), American academic administrator
Lock E. Houston (1814–1897), American politician
Lorri Houston, American pioneer

M
Marcus Houston (born 1981), American football player
Margaret Houston (disambiguation), multiple people
Marguerite Houston (born 1981), Australian rower
Marques Houston (born 1981), American singer
Marty Houston (born 1968), American stock car racing driver
Matt Houston (singer) (born 1977), French singer
Michael Houston (disambiguation), multiple people
Moira Houston (born 1961), English swimmer

N
Neil Houston (born 1957), Canadian curler
Nora Houston (1883–1942), American painter
Norman Houston (disambiguation), multiple people

P
Patrick Houston (disambiguation), multiple people
Paula Houston (born 1960), American prosecutor
Penelope Houston (born 1958), American singer-songwriter
Penelope Houston (film critic) (1927–2015), British film critic
Penny Houston (born 1942), American politician
Peter Houston (born 1958), Scottish footballer
Phil Houston, New Zealand rugby league football referee

R
Reggie Houston (born 1947), American musician
Renée Houston (1902–1980), Scottish actress
Rich Houston (1945–1982), American football player
Richard Houston (disambiguation), multiple people
Robert Houston (disambiguation), multiple people
Robin Houston (born 1947), British voice artist
Roderick Houston (born 1962), American politician
Russell Walker Houston, American politician

S
Sam Houston (disambiguation), multiple people
Scott Houston (disambiguation), multiple people
Shine Louise Houston, American filmmaker
Stephen D. Houston (born 1958), American anthropologist
Sterling Houston (1945–2006), American playwright
Stewart Houston (born 1949), Scottish football player and coach

T
Tate Houston (1924–1974), American saxophonist
Temple Lea Houston (1860-1905), American attorney and politician
Thelma Houston (born 1946), American singer
Tick Houston, American baseball player
Tim Houston (born 1970), Canadian politician
Tommy Houston (born 1945), American race car driver
Tyler Houston (born 1971), American baseball player

U
Ulysses L. Houston, American pastor

V
Velina Hasu Houston (born 1957), American playwright
Victor Houston (disambiguation), multiple people
Victoria Houston, American writer

W
Wade Houston (born 1944), American basketball coach
Walt Houston (born 1932), American football player
Walter Scott Houston (1912–1993), American astronomer
Wanda Houston, American singer
Whitney Houston (1963–2012), American singer, Model, and Actor, Producer
Will Houston (rugby referee) (born 1988), Australian rugby league referee
William Houston (disambiguation), multiple people
Wyatt Houston (born 1994), American football player

Z
Zac Houston, American baseball player
Zach Houston, American artist

See also
Huston (disambiguation), people with the given name "Huston"
Governor Houston (disambiguation)], a disambiguation page for Governors surnamed "Houston"
Senator Houston (disambiguation)], a disambiguation page for Senators surnamed "Houston"

Surnames of Scottish origin
Scottish surnames
English-language surnames